Shannon Rovers GAA is a Tipperary GAA club which is located in the north of County Tipperary, Ireland. Both hurling and Gaelic football are played in the "North Tipperary" divisional competitions.  The club is centered on the villages of Ballinderry, Terryglass and Kilbarron.

Achievements
 Tipperary Intermediate Hurling Championship Winners 1986
 North Tipperary Intermediate Football Championship Winners (2) 1990, 2011
 North Tipperary Intermediate Hurling Championship Winners (9) 1939, 1954, 1967, 1968, 1974, 1975, 1985, 1986, 2010
 Tipperary Junior A Hurling Championship (2) 1939, 1968
 North Tipperary Junior A Hurling Championship (2) 1940, 1952
 North Tipperary Junior A Football Championship (5) 1988, 1989, 2005, 2012, 2013
 North Tipperary Junior B Football Championship (1) 2004
 North Tipperary Under-21 B Hurling Championship (4) 1981, 1986, 1990, 2009 (as Shannon Rovers Gaels)
 North Tipperary Under-21 C Hurling Championship (1) 2003
 North Tipperary Under-21 B Football Championship (2) 1991, 2016 (as Shannon Rovers Gaels)
 North Tipperary Minor A Hurling Championship (1) 1957 (with Borrisokane)
 Tipperary Minor B Hurling Championship (1) 2008 (as Shannon Rovers Gaels)
 North Tipperary Minor B Hurling Championship (2) 1984, 2008 (as Shannon Rovers Gaels)
 Tipperary Minor C Hurling Championship (1) 2002 
 North Tipperary Minor C Hurling Championship (2) 2002, 2010 (as Shannon Rovers Gaels)
 Tipperary Minor B Football Championship (1) 1989 (as Shannon Rovers Gaels)

Notable players
 Pat McLoughney
 George Hannigan
 Alan Byrne
 Tommy Hogan
 Sean O'Meara
 Pat Quinlan

References

External links 
 GAA Info Profile
 Tipperary GAA site

Gaelic games clubs in County Tipperary